Željko Sopić (born 26 July 1974) is a Croatian former footballer who played as a midfielder.

Club career
Sopić started his professional career with NK Zagreb in 1994 and spent four years with the club's first team before leaving for Bundesliga side Borussia Mönchengladbach in 1998. He made 23 appearances and scored two goals in his only season in the German top flight. He went on to spend another season with Mönchengladbach in the 2. Bundesliga, following their relegation from the first division in 1999, before moving to league rivals LR Ahlen in the summer of 2000. He played for Ahlen until 2005, bringing his record in the 2. Bundesliga to a total of 155 appearances and 21 goals. He then returned to NK Zagreb for the 2005–06 season, before joining to NK Slaven Belupo, in the summer of 2006. In 2008 he came back to Zagreb but he has played for NK Lokomotiva Zagreb in the Croatian First Football League.

International career
He also won two international caps for the Croatian B national team, against Romania in 1998 and France in 1999.

Managerial career 
Sopić started as a manager with NK Rudeš in 2012. He managed a club to 2015, and in 2016 he was named the caretaker manager for Dinamo Zagreb, after Zoran Mamić had left. Before that, Sopić worked as the manager for Dinamo Zagreb II in the Croatian Second Football League, and after as the assistant manager for Ivaylo Petev in Dinamo Zagreb. On 30 January 2017, Sopić became the assistant for Zoran Mamić in Al-Ain, but two years later, on 30 January 2019, Mamić left Al-Ain and Sopić became the manager for club.

On 26 November, Sabah FK announced the appointment of Sopić on an 18-month contract.

Personal life
Sopić is the father of the German-born footballer Leon Sopić.

References

External links
 

1974 births
Living people
Footballers from Zagreb
Association football midfielders
Croatian footballers
NK Zagreb players
Borussia Mönchengladbach players
Rot Weiss Ahlen players
NK Slaven Belupo players
NK Lokomotiva Zagreb players
Croatian Football League players
Bundesliga players
2. Bundesliga players
First Football League (Croatia) players
Croatian expatriate footballers
Expatriate footballers in Germany
Croatian expatriate sportspeople in Germany
Croatian football managers
NK Rudeš managers
GNK Dinamo Zagreb managers
Al Ain FC managers
HNK Gorica managers
Croatian Football League managers
UAE Pro League managers
Croatian expatriate football managers
Expatriate football managers in the United Arab Emirates
Croatian expatriate sportspeople in the United Arab Emirates
Expatriate football managers in Azerbaijan
Croatian expatriate sportspeople in Azerbaijan
GNK Dinamo Zagreb non-playing staff